Dakka may refer to:

 Dakka language, an Austronesian language of Sulawesi, Indonesia
 Temple of Dakka, at ad-Dakka in Lower Nubia
 Ghora Dhaka or Ghora Dakka, a resort town in northeast Pakistan
 Abdulkader Dakka (born 1985), a Syrian footballer
 Dakkagun and dakkacannon, weaponry used by Orks in Warhammer 40,000

See also

 Daka (disambiguation)
 Dakar (disambiguation)
 Dhaka (disambiguation)
 Dhaka, the capital of Bangladesh
 Duqqa, an Egyptian side dish
 Dakkah (Arabic: دكة), a kind of external couch attached to the house